La Loma is a town in the Coclé Province of Panama.

Sources 
World Gazeteer: Panama – World-Gazetteer.com

Populated places in Coclé Province